Zuzana Fialová (born 17 May 1974 in Bratislava, Czechoslovakia) is a Slovak actress.

She attended the music and drama department at the Conservatory in Bratislava, and in 1998 graduated acting studies at the drama faculty of the Academy of Performing Arts in Bratislava. Currently she is preparing for a graduate degree. She is divorced and has a son. 

In 2006, she won the first season of the Slovak version of Dancing with the Stars entitled Let's Dance.

In January 2011, Fialová was among those injured in the Domodedovo International Airport bombing.

Filmography

Awards 

Notes
A  APA published only Top 3 positions until 2008. In 2008, the actress was ranked at number #3 (following the winning Diana Mórová, and Michaela Čobejová as the second).

References

General

 
Specific

External links 
 
 Zuzana Fialová gallery by Mladá fronta DNES

Living people
1974 births
Slovak stage actresses
Slovak film actresses
Slovak television actresses
Actors from Bratislava
20th-century Slovak actresses
21st-century Slovak actresses